No article on Gil Anderson currently exists but the following are closely related to that spelling:

Gillian Anderson (born 1968), American actress
Gil Andersen (1879–1935), Norwegian-American race car driver
Gail Anderson (disambiguation)